Montgomery station is an Amtrak station in Montgomery, West Virginia, served by the Cardinal passenger train. The station is an open metal shed built along platforms previously used by the Chesapeake and Ohio Railway, which demolished the former brick station house in the 1970s after the company ended passenger service in 1971. The station platform was rebuilt in 2020 to provide greater accessibility.

References

External links

Montgomery Amtrak Station (USA Rail Guide -- Train Web)

Amtrak stations in West Virginia
Buildings and structures in Fayette County, West Virginia
Stations along Chesapeake and Ohio Railway lines